NADPH oxidase 4 is an enzyme that in humans is encoded by the NOX4 gene, and is a member of the NOX family of NADPH oxidases.

Function 

Oxygen sensing is essential for homeostasis in all aerobic organisms. A phagocyte-type oxidase, similar to that responsible for the production of large amounts of reactive oxygen species (ROS) in neutrophil granulocytes, with resultant antimicrobial activity, has been postulated to function in the kidney as an oxygen sensor that regulates the synthesis of erythropoietin in the renal cortex.

Nox4 protects the vasculature against inflammatory stress. Nox-dependent reactive oxygen species modulation by amino endoperoxides can induce apoptosis in high Nox4-expressing cancer cells.

A study found that NOX4 facilitates certain beneficial adaptive responses to exercise mediated by ROS. Moreover, reductions in skeletal muscle NOX4 in aging and obesity was shown to contribute to the development of insulin resistance and may promote oxidative stress.

References

Further reading